Vice-Admiral The Honourable Sir Henry Hotham  (19 February 1777 – 19 April 1833) was officer of the British Royal Navy who served during the French Revolutionary, Napoleonic Wars, and the War of 1812, was later a member of the Board of Admiralty, and ended his career as Commander-in-Chief of the Mediterranean Fleet.

Biography

French Revolutionary Wars
He was the youngest surviving son of Beaumont Hotham (2nd Baron Hotham from 1813) and Susanna, daughter of Sir Thomas Hankey. He joined the Navy in 1790 (aged 13) serving aboard , the flagship of his uncle Rear-Admiral William Hotham.

Hotham was present as a midshipman at the Siege of Bastia in April–May 1794. He was subsequently commissioned as a lieutenant on 6 June 1794 (aged just 17) and was given command of the prize sloop  in November 1794. He was promoted to captain on 13 January 1795, in the prize frigate , and later commanded the sixth-rate  and the fifth-rate .

On 20 November 1797 he captured the French privateer brig Le Coureur, of 14 guns and 90 men, after a three-hour chase. The brig had sailed from Bayonne 31 days previously and had made no captures.

Blanche was paid off in August 1798, and Hotham was appointed to the frigate  in early 1800. He operated in the Bay of Biscay, taking several prizes. Late on the evening of 12 September 1800 he captured a small Spanish vessel laden with stone, but while boarding her observed two French privateer ships, Brave and Bellone coming out of the Gironde. He was obliged to scuttle the Spaniard to make chase. The French attempted to evade him during the night, but Hotham anticipated their movements, and was still following the next day. Unfortunately he lost them the second night, having pursued them for 259 miles. However, on 20 September, he recaptured the English ship Monarch, of 645 tons, laden with timber, which had been taken by Bellone four days earlier. On 22 September, off Cordouan Lighthouse, he chased a French brig, and by 9.30 p.m., had come within musket-shot, when both vessels unexpectedly grounded near Noirmoutier. The brig was wrecked; but Immortalite refloated herself the next morning, suffering nothing more serious than the loss of an anchor, cable, and boat. On the morning of the next day, the 24th, he spotted the French letter of marque schooner Constance, carrying a cargo of coffee and sugar from Guadaloupe to Bordeaux, but the privateer lugger Cynthia from Guernsey, captured her before he could intervene. He then, on 14 April 1801, captured the French privateer brig Laure, of 14 guns and 78 men. She was 15 days out of St. Malo, and had captured a Portuguese vessel sailing Bristol to Lisbon, and had made 17 other captures in previous cruises. On 27 July, assisted by the presence of the frigate , he captured the Invention, an unusual privateer designed and commanded by M. Thibaut. She had sailed from Bordeaux nine days before on her first cruise. Towards the close of the war in 1802, the Immortalite was blockading the port of Brest.

Napoleonic Wars
Soon after the renewal of hostilities in May 1803, Hotham obtained command of the 40-gun frigate Imperieuse, and in the same year he recaptured a South Sea whaler, homeward bound in the Channel.

He was appointed to the frigate  in April 1804, conveying Prince Augustus Frederick, Duke of Sussex from Lisbon to Portsmouth in August. In September he escorted an outward bound East India fleet, before proceeding to Halifax. On 1 December 1803 Imperieuse recaptured the ship Britannia, and on 4 November 1805 he assisted at the capture of four French ships by Sir Richard Strachan in the Battle of Cape Ortegal.

In March 1806 Hotham took command of the 74-gun , in the squadron of Rear-Admiral Robert Stopford. On 23 February 1809 Stopford's squadron fought three French frigates in the Battle of Les Sables-d'Olonne. The three French ships were anchored off the port under the protection of coastal batteries, but Defiance,  and  closed in, and fired on the French ships until forced to withdraw by the ebbing of the tide, damaging them to the extent the one was subsequently broken up, and the other two declared unfit for naval service and sold. Defiance was much cut up and had two men killed and 25 wounded. In 1807, Hotham was employed on the coast of Spain, co-operating with Spanish forces. On 24 June, shortly after the French withdrawal from the north-western ports of Ferrol and Corunna, Hotham landed a detachment of seamen and marines to destroy various batteries commanding the bay, and also captured the castle of San Felipe, still under the command of French sympathizers. On 23 December 1809 Defiance recaptured the ship Ellison from the French. On 1 June 1810 he captured the French chasse-marées Syrene, Eugene, and St. Yves.

Hotham then took command of the ship . On 5 November 1810 he recaptured the Zodiac, and on the 9th captured the Venus. On 22 November 1810, he captured the French privateer ketch Glaneuse, of 14 guns and 85 men, after a two-day pursuit, after preventing her from capturing a British packet ship. On 4 April 1811 he destroyed two chasse-marées, but not before removing 63 casks of wine from them. In 1812 Hotham was serving under Rear-Admiral Sir Harry Neale off Ushant, and was sent by him to cruise off l'Orient, to intercept three expected French vessels. Hotham skilfully manoeuvred his ship so as to force the enemy to ground themselves. Northumberland then opened a steady fire at point-blank range until the ships were abandoned and burning.

War of 1812
In December 1812 Hotham was appointed Captain of the Fleet to Admiral Sir John Borlase Warren on the North American Station. On 4 December 1813, he was promoted to rear-admiral, and nominated a Colonel of Marines. From 4 June 1814 he served under Vice-Admiral Sir Alexander Cochrane. On 17 December 1814, he submitted to the Admiralty a list of 82 American vessels captured, burnt, and destroyed by his squadron between 6 August and 9 October 1814. This does not include the frigate USS President, captured by four ships of his squadron on 15 January 1815.

Hotham was made a Knight Commander of the Most Honourable Military Order of the Bath on 2 January 1815, having his investiture on 12 April.

The Hundred Days

Post-war career
On 25 March 1818 Hotham was appointed a member of the Board of Admiralty, his position being renewed in March 1819 and February 1822, serving until March 1822. On 28 May 1825 he was promoted to vice-admiral, and returned to serve on the Board of Admiralty in September 1828, renewed in June 1829 and July 1830, until November 1830. He was appointed Commander-in-Chief in the Mediterranean on 30 March 1831, and on 4 July 1831 was made a Knight Grand Cross of the Order of St Michael and St George.

One of Hotham's more notable acts as Commander-in-Chief was claiming a new territory for Britain. In July 1831 Commander Charles Henry Swinburne of  reported a volcanic eruption and a column of vapour rising from the sea, some 26 miles off Sciacca, Sicily. Hotham, in his flagship , sailed to the new island and on 1 August sent his flag-captain Humphrey Fleming Senhouse ashore with a landing party to raise the Union Flag, and claim the island for Britain under the name "Graham Island", after the First Lord of the Admiralty, Sir James Graham. Later the Sicilians also landed, hoisted a flag, and claimed the island under the name "Ferdinandea", after King Ferdinand II of the Two Sicilies. The French made a claim to the island under the name "Julia", as did the Spanish.

Hotham died suddenly of an intracranial hemorrhage in Valletta, Malta, on 19 April 1833, and was buried at Msida Bastion Cemetery in Floriana on 24 April.

Personal life
On 6 July 1816 Hotham married Lady Frances Anne Juliana Rous, the only child of John Rous, 1st Earl of Stradbroke, and his first wife Frances Juliana Warter-Wilson. They had three sons:
 Reverend Henry John Hotham (1822–1885), Fellow of Trinity College, Cambridge 
 Reverend Frederick Harry Hotham (1824–1887), Rector of Rushbury, Shrewsbury 
 Captain Beaumont Williams Hotham (1825–1915), HM Consul at Calais 1859–1882

See also
 Baron Hotham
 South Dalton

References

External links
 

1777 births
1833 deaths
Royal Navy personnel of the French Revolutionary Wars
Royal Navy personnel of the Napoleonic Wars
Lords of the Admiralty
Royal Navy vice admirals
Younger sons of barons
Knights Commander of the Order of the Bath